The 1996 Air Force Falcons football team competed for the United States Air Force Academy in the 1996 NCAA Division I-A football season. The team was led by 13th-year head coach Fisher DeBerry and played its home games at Falcon Stadium. It finished the season with a 6–5 record overall and a 5–3 record in Western Athletic Conference games.

Schedule

Roster

References

Air Force
Air Force Falcons football seasons
Air Force Falcons football